Music from Nashville, My Home Town  is the thirtieth studio album by Chet Atkins. It was re-released on CD in 2006 combined with Chet. Both were originally released on the budget label, RCA Camden.

"Prancin' Filly" was written by Atkins' father, James A. Atkins.

Reception

Writing for Allmusic, critic Steve Leggett wrote of the reissue "Atkins was a master musician working in a genre all too often prone to caricature and posturing, and he did it all without wearing a big hat. If Atkins wasn't exactly perceived as a guitar god by the public, perhaps because everything he did seemed so smooth and effortless, other players certainly knew what he could do."

Track listing

Side one
 "Prancin' Filly" (James A. Atkins) – 1:50
 "Sidewalks of Nashville" (Lou Gottlieb) – 2:15
 "Solo Soul" (Cindy Walker) – 2:14
 "Summer Sunday" (Johnny Duncan) – 2:16
 "Around the World" (from  the film Around the World in 80 Days) (Victor Young, Harold Adamson) – 3:40

Side two
 "Ain't We Got Fun" (Raymond S. Egan, Gus Kahn, Richard Whiting) – 2:17
 "Yours" (Gonzalo Roig, Jack Sherr) – 2:30
 "Love Offering" (Jerry Reed) – 2:01
 "George's Theme" (Tommy Burk, George Gillis) – 2:07
 "Lonesome Road" (Gene Austin, Nathaniel Shilkret) – 2:46

Personnel
Chet Atkins – guitar

References

1966 albums
Chet Atkins albums
RCA Records albums